Július Torma (March 7, 1922, Budapest – October 23, 1991, Prague) was an ethnic Slovakian boxer competing for Czechoslovakia. He won the gold medal at the Olympic Games in 1948 for Czechoslovakia in the category up to 67 kg. He competed in three consecutive Summer Olympics (1948, 1952 and 1956).

Torma defeated Hank Herring of the United States in the 1948 final. Torma also competed as a welterweight in 1952, losing in the quarterfinals; and in 1956, as a Middleweight.

He was born in Budapest and died in Prague.

Olympic results 
London - 1948 (as a Welterweight)
Round of 32: Defeated Gusztav Bene (Hungary) on points
Round of 16: Defeated Clifford Blackburn (Canada) second-round knockout
Quarterfinal: Defeated Aurelio Diaz (Spain) by disqualification in second round
Semifinal: Defeated Alessandro D'Ottavio (Italy) on points
Final: Defeated Hank Herring (United States) on points (won gold medal)

Helsinki - 1952 (as a Welterweight)
Round of 32: Defeated John Patrick Maloney (Great Britain) by decision, 2-1
Round of 16: Defeated Louis Gage (United States) by decision, 2-1
Quarterfinal: Lost to Zygmunt Chychła (Poland) by decision, 1-2

Melbourne - 1956 (as a Middleweight)
Defeated Howard Richter (Australia) points
Lost to Ramón Tapia (Chile) KO by 2

References

External links
profile

1922 births
1991 deaths
Boxers from Budapest
Czechoslovak male boxers
Boxers at the 1948 Summer Olympics
Boxers at the 1952 Summer Olympics
Boxers at the 1956 Summer Olympics
Olympic boxers of Czechoslovakia
Olympic gold medalists for Czechoslovakia
Olympic medalists in boxing
Medalists at the 1948 Summer Olympics
Welterweight boxers
Hungarian emigrants
Immigrants to Czechoslovakia